UFC 125: Resolution was a mixed martial arts event held by the Ultimate Fighting Championship on January 1, 2011 at the MGM Grand Garden Arena in Las Vegas, Nevada.

Background
The planned rematch between UFC Middleweight Champion Anderson Silva and Chael Sonnen from their UFC 117 bout was at one point thought to take place at this event.

On October 26, 2010, Shane Carwin had to pull out of his fight with Roy Nelson due to a back injury that required surgery. Nelson was then pulled from the card altogether.

On October 28, 2010, UFC president Dana White announced that World Extreme Cagefighting (WEC) would merge with the UFC and that WEC Featherweight Champion José Aldo would be promoted to UFC Featherweight Champion. Josh Grispi was pulled from a planned WEC 52 bout with Erik Koch to challenge Aldo for the Featherweight title at this event. However, Aldo was later forced off the card with an injury.  Grispi remained on the card and fought Dustin Poirier.

A lightweight bout between Cole Miller and Matt Wiman, which was originally scheduled to take place at this event, was moved to UFC: Fight For The Troops 2.

UFC 125 preliminary fights were shown live for the first time on Ion Television in the United States. The preliminary fights were shown live in the United Kingdom on ESPN, Rogers Sportsnet in Canada and Fuel TV in Australia.

Results

Bonus awards
Fighters were awarded $60,000 bonuses.

Fight of the Night: Frankie Edgar vs. Gray Maynard
Knockout of the Night: Jeremy Stephens
Submission of the Night: Clay Guida

Reported payout
The following is the reported payout to the fighters as reported to the Nevada State Athletic Commission. It does not include sponsor money or "locker room" bonuses often given by the UFC and also do not include the UFC's traditional "fight night" bonuses.

Frankie Edgar: $102,000 ($51,000 win bonus) vs. Gray Maynard: $52,000 ($26,000 win bonus) ^
Brian Stann: $122,000 ($21,000 win bonus) def. Chris Leben: $96,000
Thiago Silva: $110,000 ($55,000 win bonus) def. Brandon Vera: $70,000
Dong Hyun Kim: $70,000 ($35,000 win bonus) def. Nate Diaz: $63,000
Clay Guida: $62,000 ($31,000 win bonus) def. Takanori Gomi: $50,000
Jeremy Stephens: $36,000 ($18,000 win bonus) def. Marcus Davis: $31,000
Dustin Poirier: $8,000 ($4,000 win bonus) def. Josh Grispi: $15,000
Brad Tavares: $16,000 ($8,000 win bonus) def. Phil Baroni: $25,000
Diego Nunes: $20,000 ($10,000 win bonus) def. Mike Brown: $23,000
Daniel Roberts: $24,000 ($12,000 win bonus) def. Greg Soto: $8,000
Jacob Volkmann: $24,000 ($12,000 win bonus) def. Antonio McKee: $15,000

^Although not reflected in the NSAC paperwork, both Edgar and Maynard received their win bonuses despite the draw.

References

Ultimate Fighting Championship events
2011 in mixed martial arts
Mixed martial arts in Las Vegas
2011 in sports in Nevada
MGM Grand Garden Arena